15 Big Ones is the 20th studio album by the American rock band the Beach Boys, released July 5, 1976 on Brother/Reprise. It includes a mix of original songs and renditions of rock 'n' roll and R&B standards. The LP was the band's first album with production credited solely to Brian Wilson since Pet Sounds (1966). As such, its release was accompanied by a controversial media campaign that declared his comeback as an active member of the Beach Boys' recording and touring group.

Following their previous album, Holland (1973), the band had focused on touring and attracting bigger concert audiences, especially after the unexpected success of their greatest hits compilation Endless Summer (1974). They attempted to record a new album at Caribou Ranch studio in late 1974, but it was soon abandoned, partly due to Wilson being unable or unwilling to participate. At the end of 1975, his bandmates and manager Stephen Love prevailed upon him to produce the group's next release, hoping that a new album bearing his production label credit would prove lucrative.

Most of 15 Big Ones was hastily recorded in early 1976 at the band's Brother Studios. The project was marred by disputes, as Carl and Dennis Wilson felt that the production quality was substandard and that an album of originals was more ideal, while Mike Love, Al Jardine, and Stephen wanted new Beach Boys product rushed out in order to capitalize on the group's continued resurgence in popularity. Further tensions arose from the interference of Brian's psychologist, Eugene Landy. One of the proposed titles, Group Therapy, was rejected in favor of a title that referred to both the number of tracks and the group's 15th anniversary. To support the album, Brian joined his bandmates on a major concert tour for the first time since 1964. The group also commissioned an NBC television special, titled The Beach Boys, that aired in August.

Despite mixed reviews, 15 Big Ones went gold and became the Beach Boys' best-selling album of new material since 1965. It peaked at number 8 in the U.S. and number 31 in the UK. Three singles were issued: a cover of Chuck Berry's "Rock and Roll Music" and the originals "It's OK" and "Everyone's in Love with You". The first two charted on the Billboard Hot 100 at numbers 5 and 29, respectively, and ultimately became their only top 30 hits during the 1970s. Brian later referred to 15 Big Ones and its 1977 follow-up, The Beach Boys Love You, as his life-defining albums.

Background

In January 1973, the Beach Boys' previous album, Holland, was released amid generally favorable reviews and top 40 entries in the U.S. and UK charts. Early copies of the LP were packaged with a bonus EP, Mount Vernon and Fairway, that was produced by Brian and Carl Wilson. Brian later said that his original concept for Mount Vernon and Fairway "was much more ambitious", as he had "wanted to cut new arrangements of some of the songs we used to hear on our transistor radios in the late '50s, like 'A Casual Look.'"  His bandmates took issue with the space it would have taken on the LP, and he subsequently lost interest, leaving Carl to finish the project.

After Holland, the group maintained a touring regimen, but recorded very little in the studio for the next two years. Several months earlier, they had announced that they would complete their unfinished album Smile, but this never came to fruition, and plans for its release were once again abandoned. Following the June 1973 death of the Wilsons' father and former band manager Murry, Brian retreated into his bedroom and withdrew further into drug abuse, alcoholism, chain smoking, and overeating. He reflected, "I used my room as my little castle. Added to that, I was very depressed with the Beach Boys. I couldn't talk to them and nobody in the band could relate to me. This went on for about two and a half years. But, on and off, I'd sometimes go and record."

In October 1973, the band fired their manager, Jack Rieley. By his account, he had "pulled away" from the band due to "terribly complex, complicated and horribly distasteful situations involving aspects of their business and financial management." Rieley's position was succeeded by Mike Love's brother Steve and Chicago manager James William Guercio. Blondie Chaplin and Ricky Fataar, who had joined the Beach Boys as official members in 1972, left the band in December 1973 and November 1974, respectively.

The Beach Boys' greatest hits compilation Endless Summer was released in June 1974 to unexpected success, becoming the band's second number-one U.S. album in October. The LP had a 155-week chart run, selling over 3 million copies. Its success had the effect of returning the group to being the number-one act in the U.S. Carl recalled, "There was a whole new generation of fans out there and some of them weren't even as old as the songs themselves. Our concerts were selling out and we were singing and playing better than ever." Guercio prevailed upon the group to swap out newer songs with older material in their concert setlists, partly to accommodate their growing audience and the demand for their early hits. Later in the year, members of the band appeared as guests on Chicago's hit "Wishing You Were Here". At the end of 1974, Rolling Stone proclaimed the Beach Boys "Band of the Year" based on the strength of their live performances.

Early recording history

Caribou and Brother sessions (1974)

To take advantage of their sudden resurgence in popularity, the Beach Boys accepted Guercio's invitation to record their next Reprise album at his Caribou Ranch studio, located around the mountains of Nederland, Colorado. These October 1974 sessions marked the group's return to the studio after a 21-month period of virtual inactivity, but the proceedings were cut short after Brian had insisted on returning to his home in Los Angeles. Guercio remembered, "From the day he got here, he said, 'I want to go home.'" Further complicating matters, a fire broke out in the studio and destroyed some of the tapes, after which the band resumed recording in November at their newly-constructed Brother Studios in Santa Monica.

At this time, Wilson co-wrote numerous songs with poet Stephen Kalinich, including "Child of Winter (Christmas Song)", "California Feelin'", "You're Riding High on the Music", "Lucy Jones", and "Grateful Are We for Little Children". "You're Riding High on the Music" was never recorded. "Lucy Jones", as described by Kalinich, "was just a funky song, and Brian and I were having fun." "Grateful Are We for Little Children" later became Wilson's "Saturday Morning in the City".

Other tracks recorded in 1974 were "River Song", "Our Life, Our Love, Our Land", "Don't Let Me Go", "Barnyard Blues", early versions of "It's OK" and "Good Timin", an alternate version of "Ding Dang", and renditions of "The Battle Hymn of the Republic" and "Honeycomb".  "Don't Let Me Go" is a song composed by Carl with lyrics by Love, while "Our Life, Our Love, Our Land" is a song written by Love that he described as an "ethnic" thing that sounded similar to "The Trader" from Holland. "Honeycomb" featured Brian's wife Marilyn on lead vocal.  Only four songs have been documented as being recorded at Caribou: "Battle Hymn of the Republic", "Good Timin'", "Brian's Tune" ("Ding Dang"), and "Child of Winter".

In November, Mike Love told Melody Maker that the band had completed "about 40 tracks" and that their next album would be completed by January 1975. Love reported, "Brian is very involved with the LP. ... The album's a combination between Sunflower and Holland. It's got some of the feel that Holland had, but also sounds a bit like Sunflower in certain respects." The material was written by himself ("about ten" of the songs), Brian (five), Carl and Dennis ("about five" each), and Jardine ("a couple"). The group completed a few tracks from these sessions, including "Child of Winter", but ultimately abandoned most of them. Released as a single at the end of December 1974, "Child of Winter" was their first record that displayed the credit "Produced by Brian Wilson" since 1966.

Interim and Beachago tour (1975)

With the project put on hold, the Beach Boys spent most of the next year on the road playing college football stadiums and basketball arenas. Early in 1975, Wilson signed a short-lived sideline production deal with former Beach Boy Bruce Johnston and producer Terry Melcher's Equinox Records. Together, they founded the loose-knit supergroup known as California Music. Wilson produced their covers of "Jamaica Farewell" and "Why Do Fools Fall in Love?", but his participation in the group soon ended. Over the summer, the touring group played a co-headlining series of concert dates with Chicago, a pairing that was nicknamed "Beachago". The tour was massively successful and restored the Beach Boys' profitability to what it had been in the mid-1960s.

In a July 1975 article for NME, Nick Kent reported that Carl Wilson had cited "Rollin' Up to Heaven" (retitled from "Ding Dang"), "California Feelin", and "Good Timing"  as "titles to new Brian Wilson songs recorded for the next Warner/Reprise album". Carl told Kent that the new songs demonstrated Brian's new "funky" approach.  In September, the band recorded a version of the Del-Vikings' "Come Go with Me", but the track was ultimately left off 15 Big Ones. In October, Wilson recorded a rendition of Van Dyke Parks' "Come to the Sunshine", also intended for the band's forthcoming album, but a dispute prevented the track's inclusion.

Although another joint tour with Chicago had been planned for the summer of 1976, the Beach Boys' association with Guercio and his Caribou Management company ended early in the year. Stephen Love subsequently took over as the band's de facto business manager.

Production

Initial sessions

In late 1975, Wilson volunteered himself into psychologist Eugene Landy's 24-hour therapy program. Encouraged by the positive results of Landy's treatment, Stephen Love and Wilson's bandmates requested that Wilson produce the group's several-months overdue album for Reprise. These sessions lasted from January 30 to May 15, 1976 at Brother Studios. Studio staff engineers Stephen Moffitt and Earle Mankey (a former member of Sparks) were enlisted for the project. Brian was officially credited as the sole producer for the first time on a Beach Boys LP since Pet Sounds (1966). Carl and Dennis assisted Brian with the instrumental tracks, while Al Jardine and Mike Love contributed just vocals.

As a warm-up exercise, Brian first recorded a batch of oldies with many of the session musicians that he had worked with during the mid-1960s. Mankey remembered that Wilson found it difficult to engage with musicians in the studio that he was not familiar with. "They were the fastest sessions ever. The room would be full of musicians, all the old guys from the past, and there would be some acoustic basses and open mikes. ... At the end of the song Brian would say, 'That sounded great, guys!' and head for the door." Wilson recalled, "It was a little scary because [the Beach Boys and I] weren't as close. We had drifted apart, personality-wise. A lot of the guys had developed new personalities through meditation. It was a bit scary and shaky. But we went into the studio with the attitude that we had to get it done. After a week or two in the studio, we started to get the niche again."

By this time, the Beach Boys were three albums behind schedule in their contract with Warner Bros. The original plan was for Wilson to produce one or two albums of all-original material after the oldies exercises were finished. Crawdaddy journalist Timothy White, who attended many of the album's sessions, explained that the premise "represented a compromise at a stage when the Boys felt stymied as a unit and reluctant to commit their own recent or stockpiled individual compositions to a communal album that didn't mainly feature Brian's work." According to Dennis, the group "couldn't agree on enough" with regards to the songs that they had stockpiled. Dennis said in January 1976, "We have a lot of stuff in the can we could have put together and released, but it just wasn't that. It's always left up to the writer of each song as to what will happen to it ... It takes a lot of fun out of the creativity to have to release, release." He reported that the group had planned to issue an album of oldies, and that the other albums may "take the form of a double album of all-new material that stretches from hard rock 'n' roll to these wordless vocals we've been doing that sound like the Vienna Boys Choir."

Characteristics

15 Big Ones is distinguished for its use of Moog and ARP synthesizers, played by Wilson himself, signaling a more electronic-heavy sound compared to his past productions. Mankey surmised that Wilson employed synthesizers "to fake string parts ... and not have to worry about anything else. He was in there to play the part and get out." In the assessment of biographer Peter Ames Carlin, one of the "more distressing" characteristics of the recordings is the quality of Wilson's singing. Carlin writes that Wilson, who once possessed "a powerful but tender falsetto ... now sang in a baritone croak." In his 2016 memoir, I Am Brian Wilson, it is stated that he suffered from a bout of laryngitis during the sessions, adding that his hoarse voice on the album was not his "normal voice ... It was an assumed voice."

Disagreements

Following two days in the studio, during which they recorded "Palisades Park" and "Blueberry Hill", the sessions temporarily halted due to disagreements regarding the album's direction. According to Brian, "I started to change my mind [about producing the album], and they said, 'Come on, come on, Brian. You can't stop.'" Mankey said, "It was really tense in the studio. Brian would come in around nine or ten in the morning. One day, they would get something done, and the next day they would do nothing except fight." Group meetings were supervised by Landy, and according to biographer Keith Badman, discussions over each track for the record lasted up to eight hours. Band road manager Rick Nelson acknowledged that Landy had attempted to exert unwelcome artistic control over the group. Landy remarked in a 1988 interview, "Brian and I did that [album] together."

Jardine later reported that the group were unsure if Brian possessed the competence to produce an album.  Carlin writes that the band had quickly realized that Brian "no longer had the energy or desire to get anything right [in the studio]." Carl Wilson explained, "I believe that Brian was consciously under-producing the album and that was his choice – we deferred to him. But when we voted to do it that way with those particular songs, I left the studio right there on the spot because I was very disenchanted." Without Brian's knowledge, members of the band later touched up the recordings in opposition to his desire for a "dry" sound.

A Newsweek journalist reported that Jardine and Mike Love were "all for letting Brian take full charge, even though Love makes no secret of resenting him." Mankey remembered that "[a]ll of the people in the studio" felt sorry for Brian and tried to help him improve his work, with the exception of Love and Jardine, who "just thought it was crap. They'd show up and say it was terrible." Stephen said, "Carl was dragging his feet, saying, 'This is a shitty record. This isn't anywhere near as good as it should be.'"  Carl said, "Thing is, then I came back and worked my ass off because I support my brother Brian professionally and personally." Stephen noted, "They really had mixed feelings about [Brian's comeback] because they knew it would frustrate their own designs for their own music. But they probably liked it economically, because they knew it was going to get them a bigger record deal."

Dennis later complained, "I was unhappy with the oldies – absolutely. The album should have been 100% original. We had enough Brian Wilson material to do it. ... Steve Love, Mike Love and Alan Jardine were pushing to get it out – it was just a big push. They'd rather just get it out there than take time with it and develop it. Carl and I were really upset." Steve countered that "the hard truth is that you don't have forever to tinker around with this stuff. The pressing demands of business sometimes interfere with artistic indulgence. Business-wise you want to get the goddamn album out when things are gelling." Mike did not believe that time constraints was to blame for the album's "rough sections", explaining that it was not publicly disclosed that Carl had suffered "a debilitating back injury" and had been "self-medicating and drinking".

Sessions resumed in early March. Ultimately, a compromise was reached, with the album including a mix of covers and originals.  Brian told an interviewer that "15 Big Ones started out as an album of nothing but oldies, but then we ran out of them. Halfway through, Mike Love decided to make the record half old and half new. I didn't like the idea at first, but he literally forced us to do it his way. I resented that."  However, by the time they had finished in May, the group had recorded almost nothing but covers.

Songs

Originals
"It's OK", written by Brian and Mike, is an upbeat song about celebrating summer fun.  "Had to Phone Ya" was written by Wilson while his wife Marilyn was away in Europe. "Everyone's in Love with You", written about the Maharishi Mahesh Yogi, was Mike Love's second ever solo contribution to a Beach Boys album. "That Same Song" was described by Carlin as "a whimsical history of world music that came close to sparking the gospel fire it set out to ignite". "T M Song" begins with a mock argument between the band members, possibly based on the real life arguments that had been occurring among themselves.

Two of the songs predated the album by several years. The first, "Susie Cincinnati", is Al Jardine's only writing contribution to the album. It was recorded in 1969 during the sessions for the album Sunflower (1970). Brian included it on 15 Big Ones "because it's a good song", although Dennis felt that it was a "silly piece of shit". "Back Home" was originally written in 1963 by Brian and his roommate Bob Norberg. It is semi-autobiographical; Brian sings in the chorus of wanting to return to Ohio, which happened to be the homestate of his great-grandparents. Carlin notes the 15 Big Ones version for featuring "a throbbing bass, bouncing organ riffs, and a spirited vocal from Brian."

Cover versions

According to Wilson, "We thought about songs that were standards and, since they were acceptable once, we figured they would be acceptable again. ... We figured it was a safe way to go." The eight selections included on the album were "Rock and Roll Music" (originally by Chuck Berry), "Chapel of Love" (originally by Darlene Love), "Talk to Me" (originally by Little Willie John), "Palisades Park" (originally by Freddy Cannon), "A Casual Look" (originally by the Six Teens), "Blueberry Hill" (originally by Fats Domino), "In the Still of the Night" (originally by the Five Satins), and "Just Once in My Life" (originally by the Righteous Brothers).

"Rock and Roll Music" was chosen, according to Love, because he felt that the band could possibly repeat the success they had with covering Berry's "Sweet Little Sixteen" as "Surfin' U.S.A." (1963). Dennis was originally slated to sing the lead on "Blueberry Hill", but Wilson gave the part to Love so that Love would not feel left out. "Palisades Park" was the source of inspiration for the Beach Boys' songs "County Fair" (1962) and "Amusement Parks U.S.A." (1965). Carl recorded his vocal in one take. Brian praised Carl's performance and ranked it as "one of my top five Beach Boys vocals. He nailed it."

In the assessment of musicologist Philip Lambert, most of the covers remained faithful to the originals, however, "Blueberry Hill", "Talk to Me", and "Palisades Park" were the exceptions in which the listener gets "more of a sense of the younger Brian Wilson, not just reproducing originals but dignifying them with his own personal flavorings".

Outtakes
Although they were not included on the album, the band also recorded versions of "Sea Cruise", "On Broadway", "Mony, Mony", "Running Bear", "Shake, Rattle and Roll", "Secret Love", "Don't Fight the Sea", "Peggy Sue", "Michael Rowed the Boat Ashore", and "Let's Dance". Other discarded tracks included the originals "Short Skirts" (Brian), "Gold Rush" (Jardine), "Lisa", "Glow, Crescent, Glow" (Mike), "10,000 Years Ago", and "Rainbows" (Dennis).

Packaging and artwork

Group Therapy, a title proposed by Dennis, was rejected in favor of Dean Torrence's suggestion, 15 Big Ones, which referred to both the number of tracks and the group's 15th anniversary. It was packaged with cover artwork that showed photos of the individual band members inside five interlocking rings, resembling the logo for the Olympic Games. This was an intentional reference to the fact that 1976 had been an Olympic year. Mike Love reflected, "The images of Brian, Dennis, Carl, Al, and me in five interlocking circles could have been a metaphor for five bandmates united in common purpose, or five guys living in their separate worlds. With us, it was both." A logo that displayed the band's name, designed by Torrence, was introduced with this release and kept as the Beach Boys' official logo for decades afterward.

Release

Publicity campaign

To highlight Brian's recovery and his return to writing and producing, Stephen Love devised a promotional campaign with the tagline "Brian Is Back!", and paid the Rogers & Cowan publicity agency $3,500 per month to implement it (equivalent to $ in ). In Gaines' description, the resultant "media coverage was enormous", appearing across Newsweek, New West, Rolling Stone, Crawdaddy, the New York Times, and the Los Angeles Times. It marked the highest level of press attention that Wilson had received since Derek Taylor's "Brian Wilson is a genius" campaign from 1966. Landy involved himself by openly discussing Wilson's condition and other aspects of his personal life to journalists.

In June 1976, Brian gave his first press interviews in several years, and in July, the band produced a six-hour documentary retrospective for U.S. radio. At the centerpiece of the "Brian Is Back!" campaign was the release of 15 Big Ones on July 5. On August 5, NBC premiered a Lorne Michaels-produced television special about the band, called simply The Beach Boys. It included live performances of "Rock and Roll Music", "It's OK" (both drawn from their July 5 concert at Anaheim Stadium), and "That Same Song" (filmed with the 75-piece Double Rock Baptist Choir). On August 23, the band were given a five-page cover story on that week's issue of People magazine.

Despite its success, the "Brian Is Back" promotion proved controversial. Wilson had often solicited drugs from his interviewers and had remarked on one occasion that he "'felt like a prisoner".  The Guardians Alexis Petridis wrote that the articles from this period were "heartbreaking and horrifying in equal measure, depicting a halting, visibly terrified man". Sounds journalist Sandy Robertson wrote in 1980,

On September 17, 1976, Brian appeared as a guest presenter on Don Kirshner's Annual Rock Music Awards program, where he was nominated for the Hall of Fame category and lost to the Beatles. Carl and Dennis accompanied him to the podium. On November 16, BBC-2 premiered an episode of The Old Grey Whistle Test that included host Bob Harris' interview with Brian, which had been filmed on September 21.

Wilson made his first talk show appearance on November 23, on The Mike Douglas Show, followed by an appearance on NBC's Saturday Night, on November 26. Both appearances included a performance of "Back Home". That month, Rolling Stone published David Felton's feature story, "The Beach Boys: The Healing of Brother " , which presented unfavorable depictions of the band, Brian's wife Marilyn, and other family and friends.

Concert tours
Starting on July 2, 1976, Wilson made regular concert appearances with his bandmates for the first time since December 1964, singing and alternating between bass guitar and piano. Some reports erroneously state that it was the first time Wilson had appeared onstage with the band since 1964; in fact, Wilson had last done so in 1973.

From July 3 to August 15, 1976, the group embarked on a string of major stadium concert dates across the U.S. Supporting musicians included Billy Hinsche (guitar), Ed Carter (guitar, bass), Ron Altbach (keyboards), and Carlos Muñoz (keyboards). The setlists for these dates included "Susie Cincinnati", "Palisades Park", "It's OK", "A Casual Look", "Back Home", and "Rock and Roll Music".

In his review of the Beach Boys' concert at Anaheim, Melody Maker reporter Harvey Kubernick wrote that Wilson "seemed uncomfortable on stage" and "shouldn't be subjected to being propped up on stage for video purposes or group/media examination. His contributions this afternoon were nil! Following the tour, the Beach Boys played a further dozen concert dates at stadiums and basketball arenas, but this time without Brian's participation.

Commercial performance and singles
15 Big Ones peaked at number 8 in the U.S., becoming their first top 10 album of new material since Pet Sounds, and their highest-charting studio album since Summer Days (And Summer Nights!!) (1965). It also became their second Warner Bros. release to be certified gold.

On May 24, 1976, lead single "Rock and Roll Music" (backed with "T M Song") was released as the band's first new single in 16 months, peaking in the U.S. at number 5, their highest chart position for a single since "Good Vibrations" (1966). The second single, "It's OK" (backed with "Had to Phone Ya"), was issued in the U.S. on August 30 and peaked at number 29.  On November 8, the third and last single, "Susie Cincinnati" (backed with "Everyone's in Love with You") was issued in the U.S. and failed to chart.

Critical reception

15 Big Ones received mixed reviews and was largely disliked by the group's fanbase. Much of the criticism centers around the cover songs, Dennis' and Brian's rough vocal performances, and the record's perceived unfinished, forced, and rushed quality.

White wrote in his Crawdaddy review that the album was a disappointment; although it "does boast several bright moments – but no brilliant ones." Less favorably, a reviewer for The Village Voice described the album as "the kind of music one might expect to find at a rock star's funeral."  According to Carlin, most other reviewers "gave 15 Big Ones gentle treatment", such as in Newsweek, which described the album as "fascinating ... [with] a curiously unshakable unity." Similarly, Jim Miller of Rolling Stone decreed that it was "the most idiosyncratic — and flaky — record I have heard in some time, and it fascinates me."

Among retrospective reviews, AllMusic's John Bush felt that most of the covers were "simply too well known to be reworked effectively, by anyone", but favorably compared "It's OK" and "Had to Phone Ya" to "Brian's odd pop songs on late-'60s albums like Friends and 20/20." Robert Christgau bemoaned the selection of covers and their lack of a "playful, goofy vocal intensity".  Blenders Douglas Wolk wrote that the album is "[o]verwhelmed by clunky covers and bored performances". Pitchforks Eric Kempfe described the album as "muddy and confused" and highlighted "Had to Phone Ya" and "Back Home" as the best originals. Kempfe added that, with the exception of "Just Once in My Life", the covers "are notable only for the morbid fascination they hold ... Brian's once-sweet falsetto is reduced to a hoarse crackle; as a result, Mike Love's painful nasal whine is the dominant voice on the record."

In his book Icons of Rock, Scott Schinder called 15 Big Ones "largely a letdown,  largely of lackluster remakes of rock and roll oldies, along with a handful of lightweight but charming new songs by Brian. Rock critic Nick Kent called it "utterly uninspired and weary-sounding ... clearly intended only as therapy for Wilson's long dormant production talents." Musician Dennis Diken of the Smithereens, who wrote the liner notes to the album's 2000 reissue, acknowledged such criticisms and opined, "If you can accept all these points and put it behind you that this isn't Smile, Pet Sounds or even Wild Honey, give 15 Big Ones a spin and dig on what is a very cool and fun Beach Boys album."

Aftermath and legacy

At the time, Brian described the album as "nothing too deep" and promised that his next effort would be as ambitious as "Good Vibrations". He mentioned that he felt 15 Big Ones was "a good album" and "if you listen to it, you can see where all the work went", adding that if it had been disliked by "the kids", then it "would have wrecked me and I'd probably have hidden out again." In a 1998 interview, he referred to 15 Big Ones and the band's next release, The Beach Boys Love You (1977), as his favorite Beach Boys albums. "That's when it all happened for me. That's where my heart lies."

Other members of the band, including Carl and Dennis, disparaged the album in the press when it was released.  Dennis felt that it was "a great mistake to put Brian in full control" and that the "whole process was a little bruising." He admitted, "We were heartbroken. People have waited all this time, anticipating a new Beach Boys album, and I hated to give them this." Mike Love declined to comment on the album when asked by a reporter. In White's belief, the troubled sessions "precipitated the abrupt solo career decisions by Dennis and Carl Wilson", and what he had witnessed convinced him that "the greatest obstacle the Beach Boys face is that of five divergent personalities, fraught with jealousies, fears, foibles, conflicting interests and basic stylistic disagreements."

Matijas-Mecca argued that 15 Big Ones marked the beginning of a one-and-a-half-year period in which "Brian produced some of his most creative and interesting (if not necessarily commercial) music since he abandoned SMiLE." Journalist Brian Chidester similarly described the era as the end of "Wilson's full retreat as leader of the Beach Boys", although Wilson "never returned to the form that saw him produce groundbreaking works like Pet Sounds and Smile." Diken wrote, "One might also view the album as Brian's salvation from a goal-less downward spiral and an imminent crash landing."

Track listing

Note
 "Talk to Me" includes an interpolation of the 1959 song "Tallahassee Lassie", originally performed by Freddy Cannon.

Personnel
Credits adapted from the liner notes of the album's 2000 reissue.

The Beach Boys
Al Jardine – lead (3, 8, 10-11) and backing vocals (all tracks), guitar (10)
Mike Love – lead (1-3, 5, 11-12) and backing vocals (all tracks), arranger (2, 5)
Brian Wilson – lead (3-4, 7, 13) and backing vocals (all tracks except 5), organ (1-2, 6-9, 12-13, 15), piano (1-4, 6-7, 9, 11, 14-15), Moog bass (2, 4, 6, 13-15), ARP synthesizer (1), ARP String Ensemble (4-5, 14-15), bass guitar (10), harmonica (10), chimes (12), bells (13), arranger (1-3, 6-15)
Carl Wilson – lead (3, 6, 9, 15) and backing vocals (1-3, 5-7, 9-15), guitars (2, 4-5, 10, 12-13), bass (5-6, 11), synthesizer (9), Jew's harp (13), percussion (13, 15)
Dennis Wilson – lead (3, 14) and backing vocals (1-3, 6, 10, 12, 14), drums (1-8, 11, 13-15), percussion (11), vibraphone (7)

Touring members
Ron Altbach – piano (5), harpsichord (5), accordion (7)
Ed Carter – guitar (1, 3, 5-8, 11, 15)
Billy Hinsche – guitar (1, 3, 6, 8, 11, 15)

Guests

Daryl Dragon – clavinet (10), vocal arrangement (5)
Dennis Dragon – drums (10)
Ricky Fataar – drums (2), percussion (15)
Bruce Johnston – backing vocals (10, 15), piano (12)
Charles Lloyd – flute (5)
Toni Tennille – backing vocals (5)
Marilyn Wilson – backing vocals (1-3, 7)
Roy Wood (credited as "Roy Wood and Wizzard") – saxophone (2)

Additional session musicians

Mike Altschul – saxophone (1, 4), clarinet (1)
Ben Benay – guitar (9)
Hal Blaine – drums (9, 12)
Jerry Cole – guitar (9)
Steve Douglas – saxophone (1, 3-9, 12), horns (11), flute (8)
Dennis Dreith – saxophone (1, 4), clarinet (1-3)
Tim Drummond – bass (7)
Gene Estes – percussion (6)
Carl L. Fortina – accordion (9, 12)
James D. Hughart – string bass (12)
Jules Jacobs – clarinet (2-3)
Plas Johnson – saxophone (9)
John J. Kelson, Jr. – saxophone (1, 4), clarinet (1)
Jack Nimitz – saxophone (1, 4), clarinet (1)
Jay Migliori – saxophone (5-8), horns (11), flute (8)
Carol Lee Miller – autoharp (1, 4)
Ray Pohlman – bass (9)
Lyle Ritz – bass (3, 9)
Bobby Shew – trumpet (3)
Thomas J. Tedesco – guitar (12)
Julius Wechter – percussion (9), bells (9, 12)
Maureen L. West – harp (5)

The Sid Sharp Strings (3, 6-7)

Murray Adler – violin (7)
Arnold Belnick – violin (3)
Henry Ferber – violin (3)
Lori Klass – violin (7)
Lou Klass – violin (6)
Bernard Kundell – violin (6)
William Kurasch – violin (7)
James Getzoff – violin (6)
Henry L. Roth – violin (6)
Sidney Sharp – violin (3, 7)
Tibor Zelig – violin (7)

Technical
 Dean Torrence and Jim Evans – album cover, art direction and logo

Charts

Notes

References

Bibliography

Further reading

External links

 15 Big Ones on YouTube
 
 
 
 
 
  (documentary excerpt)

The Beach Boys albums
Reprise Records albums
1976 albums
Covers albums
Albums produced by Brian Wilson
Caribou Records albums
Brother Records albums
Albums with cover art by Dean Torrence
Rock-and-roll albums